Hesperentomon monlunicum is a species of proturan in the family Hesperentomidae. It is found in Southern Asia.

References

Protura
Articles created by Qbugbot
Animals described in 1984